Des Newton is a former Gaelic footballer and manager from County Roscommon, Ireland. He played with the Roscommon county team from the 1970s until the 1990s. He won three Connacht Senior Football Championships and an All-Ireland Under-21 Football Championship in 1978 with Roscommon.

Newton also played for  the Donegal county team. He won an Ulster Senior Football Championship in 1983, with manager Brian McEniff turning to Newton (then living in Inishowen) as a replacement for Matt Gallagher, who sustained a hand injury before the semi-final and missed the Ulster final and All-Ireland semi-final with appendicitis.

As a manager he has been involved with Kilmacud Crokes and St Judes in Dublin for a number years and served as a selector. In 2011 he was appointed manager of the Roscommon senior team but stood down after the 2012 season.

Honours
 All-Ireland Under-21 Football Championship: 1978
 Connacht Senior Football Championship: 1980, 1990&1991
 Ulster Senior Football Championship: 1983

References

Year of birth missing (living people)
Living people
Clan na Gael (Roscommon) Gaelic footballers
Donegal inter-county Gaelic footballers
Gaelic football managers
Gaelic football selectors
Roscommon inter-county Gaelic footballers